Judgement is the sixth studio album by the German-based alternative electronic band VNV Nation, released in 2007.

It charted at no. 55 in the mainstream German charts, charting for 3 weeks.

Track listing

Info
Music and lyrics by Ronan Harris
Tracks 2–9 produced by Ronan Harris and Andre Winter
Tracks 1 and 10 produced and mixed by Ronan Harris
Tracks 2–9 mixed by Ronan Harris, Sven Heine, Lutz Rahn and Andre Winter
Mastered by Chris Gehringer at Sterling Sound, New York City
Published by AMV Talpa
Artwork by Michał Karcz

Track descriptions
Illusion was used successfully on a YouTube video paired with the work by artist Andrew Huang until it was taken down due to confusion by viewers who thought Mr. Huang had plagiarized the music. Five months after its release the song gained attention in the UK by being dedicated to Sophie Lancaster, the victim of mob attack murder. The song also appears during the end credits of Hellblade: Senua's Sacrifice.

Equipment used
Modular systems: Modcan System B, Dotcom Orgon, Arp 2600
Analogue and hardware synths: Roland SH-2, Roland TB-303, Dave Smith Polyevolver, Creamwave Noah
Computer and software: Apple Powermac G5, Logic Audio Pro 7.2, Sculpture, EXS24, Spectrasonics Atmosphere, Stylus RMX, Timewarp 2600, TC Powercore Virus, Native Instruments Reaktor 5, Native Instruments Battery 2, MOTU Symphonic Instrument

References

External links
 http://www.industrial-music.com/ Metropolis Record mail order; information about the album
 www.vnvnation.de Song samples
 VNV Nation Website
 VNV Nation MySpace Page

2007 albums
VNV Nation albums